Hasanabad (also Romanized as Ḩasanābād; also known as Ḩasanābād-e Sabad) is a village in Rob-e Shamat Rural District, Sheshtomad District, Sabzevar County, Razavi Khorasan Province, Iran. At the 2006 census, its population was 350, in 84 families.

References 

Populated places in Sabzevar County